Sylvain-Charles, comte Valée (17 December 1773 – 16 August 1846), born in Brienne-le-Château, was a Marshal of France.

Upon the outbreak of the French Revolution, Valée enlisted in the French revolutionary army and was sent to serve in the Army of the Nord. Promoted to captain in 1795 and to lieutenant colonel in 1804, Valée distinguished himself in the Battle of Jena, after which he was promoted to colonel in 1807 and given command of the 1st Artillery Regiment. In 1809, Valée was made commander of the artillery of the III Corps in Spain, where he distinguished himself in the sieges of Lleida, Tarragona, Tortosa and Valencia. In 1811 Valée was promoted to général de division and in 1814 Napoléon created him a count.

With the restoration of the House of Bourbon to the throne of France, Valée was made Inspector-General of the artillery. Although Napoléon upon his return from Elba made him commander of the artillery of the 5th military division, after the failure of the Waterloo campaign and the second restoration, Valée was retained by Louis XVIII as Inspector-General of the artillery. In this position he reorganized the French artillery, implementing the "Valée system".

Put on the non active list in September 1830, Valée was made a Peer of France in 1835 and in 1837 when the need arose for an experienced artillery general, Valée was reinstated on the active service list and sent to Algeria. He commanded the artillery in the expedition against Constantine, and after the death of the army's commander, general Charles-Marie Denys de Damrémont, Valée was made commander of the French expeditionary forces. The forces commanded by Valée stormed and captured the city on October 13, a feat which gained him the Marshal's baton. Valée founded Skikda, and built the largest Roman theatre in Algeria in the town. It was built upon the ruins of ancient Roman and Phoenician history.

Valée was then made governor-general and served in this capacity until 1840. During his time as governor-general, Valée was faced with the insurrection of Abd-el-Kader. Count Valéé died in 1846 in Paris.

References

Marshals of France
1773 births
1846 deaths
Counts of France
French military personnel of the French Revolutionary Wars
French military personnel of the Napoleonic Wars
Peers of France
Names inscribed under the Arc de Triomphe
Governors general of Algeria